"I Hate You Now..." is a song by US singer Marcella Detroit, released in June 1996 as the first single from her third album Feeler. The single is also her first release with both AAA Records and Mega Records. The single failed to reach the same success as many of Detroit's previous releases, peaking at #107 on the uncompressed UK Singles Chart, and #96 on the compressed UK singles chart (with deleted titles for singles with declining sales beyond #75).  In Australia, the single peaked at #166.

Critical reception 
British magazine Music Week rated the song three out of five, adding, "This Eighties-sounding pop offering is a grower — if you can stomach Detroit's glass-shattering choruses. Quirky."

Track listing 
CD Single
"I Hate You Now..." — 3:37
"Boy" — 3:28

Charts

References 

1996 singles
Marcella Detroit songs
Songs written by Marcella Detroit
1996 songs